Samachar may refer to :
Samachar : A News agency formed during the emergency after merging Press Trust of India, United News of India, Samachar Bharati and Hindustan Samachar.
Samachar : A news website from Mahindra Satyam.
News : Hindi translation of News.